Sorokinsky (masculine), Sorokinskaya (feminine), or Sorokinskoye (neuter) may refer to:
Sorokinsky District, a district of Tyumen Oblast
Sorokinsky (rural locality), a rural locality (a settlement) in Arkhangelsk Oblast, Russia
Sorokinskaya, a rural locality (a village) in Arkhangelsk Oblast, Russia